Mariama Sonah Bah (born 21 May 1978) is a Guinean judoka. She competed in the women's middleweight event at the 2000 Summer Olympics.

References

1978 births
Living people
Guinean female judoka
Olympic judoka of Guinea
Judoka at the 2000 Summer Olympics
Place of birth missing (living people)